Haemanota chrysozona is a moth of the family Erebidae. It is found in French Guiana.

References

 

Haemanota
Moths described in 1905